The 204th Schutzmannschafts Battalion was a police guard unit composed from the ethnic Ukrainians personnel drafted at the Lemberg area of the  Distrikt Galizien at January – February 1943. Members of the unit committed atrocities against Jews and Communist party members during early German occupation The unit provided guards for concentration camp Pustków. In July 1943 it was reinforced to 800 strength by the volunteers signed for  the 14th Waffen Grenadier Division of the SS (1st Ukrainian).
In late July 1944 battalion personnel was transferred into reserve regiment of the 14 SS Freiwilligen Division "Galizien”.

Activity
The Pustkow Concentration Camps  was created to support the production and  the tests of the German  V-1 and V-2 missiles  – so due to the secrecy there no clear information about specific  unit activities.

References

Ukrainian Auxiliary Police‎
District of Galicia
Military units and formations established in 1943
Military units and formations disestablished in 1944